This is a list of Transport Ministers of Bihar; which function as heads of the Indian state of Bihar's Ministry of Transport and members of the Bihar government's cabinet.

References

 http://transport.bih.nic.in/

Transport Ministers
Transport Ministers
Bihar, Transport Ministersis
Lists of government ministers of Bihar